Matt Houston is an American crime drama television series starring Lee Horsley as the title character, a wealthy oilman who decides to hold a side job as a private investigator. Created by Lawrence Gordon and produced by Aaron Spelling, it originally aired on ABC for three seasons from 1982 to 1985.

Synopsis
Matt Houston starred Lee Horsley as a wealthy mustachioed Texas oilman named Matlock "Matt" Houston who works as a private investigator in Los Angeles in his abundant free time.  The show also starred Pamela Hensley as his lawyer sidekick, C.J., and George Wyner as his continuously frustrated business manager, Murray. During the show's third and final season (1984–85), Buddy Ebsen played Houston's uncle, Roy Houston.

Most episodes typically involve one of Houston's close friends being murdered or involved in some criminal enterprise, requiring his assistance. C.J. had access to an Apple III computer named "Baby" containing a database on virtually all living and deceased persons, allowing her to provide all necessary information. Murray frequently complained that Matt's private investigation business failed to make money, while Matt treated it more as an expensive hobby rather than a profit-making venture.

Cast
 Lee Horsley ... Mattlock 'Matt' Houston 
 Pamela Hensley ... C.J. Parsons 
 John Aprea ... Lt. Vince Novelli 
 Paul Brinegar ... Lamar Pettybone 
 Dennis Fimple ... Bo 
 Penny Santon ... Mama Rosa Novelli 
 Lincoln Kilpatrick ... Lt. Michael Hoyt 
 Buddy Ebsen ... Uncle Roy Houston 
 George Wyner ... Murray Chase

Episodes

Season 1 (1982–83)

Season 2 (1983–84)

Season 3 (1984–85)

Home media
On March 9, 2010, CBS DVD (Distributed by Paramount) released season 1 of Matt Houston on DVD in Region 1 for the first time.  Season 2 was released June 16, 2017 and Season 3 was released on July 21, 2017.

On May 4, 2015, it was announced that all three seasons of Matt Houston would be released the summer of 2015 by VEI, Inc.  The release was pushed back and was later released on July 15, 2016.

Award nominations

References

External links
 
 Matt Houston episode guide
DVD Review of Season One with production history

1982 American television series debuts
1985 American television series endings
1980s American crime drama television series
American Broadcasting Company original programming
English-language television shows
Television series by CBS Studios
Television series by Spelling Television
Television shows set in Los Angeles
Houston, Matt